The HTC Touch HD, also known as the HTC T828X or its codename the HTC Blackstone, is a Windows Mobile 6.1 Pocket PC designed and manufactured by HTC launched in 2008.

Part of the HTC Touch Family, it features a larger, higher-resolution display than those found in most smart-phones available at the time, a 5-megapixel camera, a second front-facing camera to enable Videophone functionality, an accelerometer, GPS, FM RDS radio reception, high resolution video recording capability and SD Micro card compatibility (up to 64 GB). It also features quad band GSM and dual band UMTS connectivity, as well as the proprietary TouchFLO 3D user interface developed by HTC. However, it lacks the left side slide-out keyboard of the HTC Touch Pro.

Details of the device were leaked several days before an official press release and a new product page confirmed the specifications and the release date in Europe (Q4 2008). HTC announced that the Touch HD would be available in the UK from November 7, 2008. While the FCC has approved the HTC Touch HD for the US, HTC has confirmed that the device will not officially be available in the US. The Touch HD generally received mixed reviews from critics, praising its screen, colors, most of the hardware and applications, but its lighting of the screen was criticized.

Specifications 
The following specifications are those found on the HTC website.
Screen size: 
Screen resolution: 480 × 800 (65k colour)
Input devices: Resistive touchscreen, front panel buttons, Built in Active Stylus
Battery: 1350 mAh
Talk time: up to 480 minutes (GSM) up to 420 minutes (WCDMA)
Standby time: up to 440 hours (GSM) up to 680 hours (WCDMA)
Video call time: up to 140 minutes
5.1-megapixel rear-facing camera with autofocus, VGA CMOS color front-facing camera for video calls
GPS and A-GPS
Qualcomm MSM 7201A 528 MHz ARM processor
RAM: 288 MB
ROM: 512 MB
With HTC sense and TouchFlo 3D
Browser: Opera Mobile
3G: Up to 7.2 Mbit/s download speed, up to 2 Mbit/s upload speed
microSD slot (SDHC compatible)
Operating system: Windows Mobile 6.1 Professional
Quad band GSM/GPRS/EDGE (GSM 850, GSM 900, GSM 1800, GSM 1900)
Wi-Fi (802.11b/g)
Bluetooth 2.0 + EDR & A2DP
Mini USB (HTC ExtUSB)
3.5 mm audio jack, microphone, speaker
FM radio
G-Sensor
Ambient light sensor
Size:  (h)  (w)  (d)
Weight:  with battery

References

External links 
 HTC Product Page
 US FCC Documentation

Touch HD
Windows Mobile Professional devices